Lieutenant General Sir Charles James Briggs,  (22 October 1865 – 27 November 1941) was a British Army officer who held high command in World War I.

Military career 
Born the son of Colonel Charles James Briggs, JP, DL, Brigg's education took place largely abroad, including periods in France and Germany. He was commissioned into the 1st King's Dragoon Guards on 30 January 1886 and served as ADC to the General Officer Commanding Egypt from 1892 to 1893. Promoted to captain on 1 March 1893, he became Adjutant of the 1st Dragoon Guards in November 1894 and Brigade Adjutant of the 4th Cavalry Brigade in April 1897. He served in the Second Boer War as Brigade Major of the 3rd Cavalry Brigade and was wounded at the Battle of Magersfontein (December 1899). He received a brevet rank as major on 29 November 1900, and was promoted to the substantive rank of major on 14 June 1902. Following the end of the war in June 1902, he left Cape Town on the SS Sicilia and returned to Southampton in late July. For his services during the war, he received a brevet promotion to lieutenant-colonel in the South African Honours list published on 26 June 1902. Reported to be medically unfit for foreign service after his return from the war, he was on 1 November 1902 appointed in command of a provisional regiment of Lancers, stationed at Ballincollig. He went on to command the 1st Imperial Light Horse and then a Mobile Column, before transferring to the 6th Dragoons in July 1904.

He was appointed commander of the Transvaal Volunteers in 1905 and took part in suppressing the Bambatha Rebellion in 1906. He was appointed commander of the South Eastern Mounted Brigade in 1910 and commanded the Blue cavalry in the Army Manoeuvres of 1912. He served in World War I initially as commander of 1st Cavalry Brigade in the British Expeditionary Force, where he took part in the action at Nery. He commanded 3rd Cavalry Division from May 1915, the 28th Division in Salonika from October 1915 and XVI Corps (later redesignated as the British Salonika Army) from May 1916.

He was chief of the British Military Mission to South Russia from February to June 1919 before retiring in February 1923. In retirement he was colonel of the 1st King's Dragoon Guards from 16 March 1926 to 31 December 1939.

Decorations 
These include:
 Knight Commander of the Order of the Bath (military division) [K.C.B. cr. 1917]
 Knight Commander of the Order of St. Michael and St. George [K.C.M.G. cr. 1918]
 Order of the White Eagle (Russia)
 Commander of the Legion of Honour (France)
 Grand Officer of the Order of the White Eagle with Swords (Serbia)
 Grand Commander of the Order of the Redeemer (Greece)
 Queen's South Africa Medal 1899–1902 with 5 clasps
 King's South Africa Medal 1901–1902 with 2 clasps
 Natal Rebellion Medal 1906 with clasp '1906'
 1914–1915 Star
 British War Medal 1914–1920
 Allied Victory Medal 1914–1919 with oak leaf
 Queen Victoria Golden Jubilee Medal 1897
 War Cross with palm (Greece)
 Medal of Military Merit, 1st class Greece

References 

 

|-

1865 births
1941 deaths
People from Sunderland
British Army cavalry generals of World War I
British Army personnel of the Second Boer War
Knights Commander of the Order of the Bath
Knights Commander of the Order of St Michael and St George
Commandeurs of the Légion d'honneur
Recipients of the War Cross (Greece)
Recipients of the Order of the White Eagle (Russia)
Recipients of the Medal of Military Merit (Greece)
1st King's Dragoon Guards officers
6th (Inniskilling) Dragoons officers
Imperial Light Horse officers
British Army personnel of the Russian Civil War